The 1956 Tasmanian state election was held on 13 October 1956.

Retiring Members
No sitting MHAs retired at this election.

House of Assembly
Sitting members are shown in bold text. Tickets that elected at least one MHA are highlighted in the relevant colour. Successful candidates are indicated by an asterisk (*).

Bass
Six seats were up for election. The Labor Party was defending three seats. The Liberal Party was defending three seats.

Braddon
Six seats were up for election. The Labor Party and the Liberal Party were each defending three seats, although Labor MHA Carrol Bramich had defected to the Liberals.

Denison
Six seats were up for election. The Labor Party was defending three seats. The Liberal Party was defending three seats.

Franklin
Six seats were up for election. The Labor Party was defending three seats. The Liberal Party was defending three seats.

Wilmot
Six seats were up for election. The Labor Party was defending three seats. The Liberal Party was defending three seats.

See also
 Members of the Tasmanian House of Assembly, 1955–1956
 Members of the Tasmanian House of Assembly, 1956–1959

References
Tasmanian Parliamentary Library

Candidates for Tasmanian state elections